Elliott George Johnson (born 17 August 1994) is an English professional footballer who plays as a left-back for National League club Dagenham & Redbridge.

Career
Johnson was born in Hendon, London. He was first registered as a first-team player at Barnet as a 16-year-old in October 2010, and featured on the bench in several games in the 2010–11 and 2011–12 seasons. He signed his first professional contract in May 2012, and finally made his debut when he started a League Two match at home to Torquay United on 6 November 2012. He scored his first goal for Barnet in a 3–2 defeat at Accrington Stanley on 16 March 2013.

Johnson was part of the team that won the Conference Premier in 2014-15 and was Barnet's first choice left back for eight seasons. He left the club at the end of the 2019-20 season, after 270 appearances, scoring five goals.

Johnson signed for Dagenham & Redbridge on 11 August 2020.

Career statistics

Honours
Barnet
Conference Premier: 2014–15

References

External links
Elliott Johnson profile at the Barnet F.C. website

1994 births
Living people
Footballers from Hendon
English footballers
Association football defenders
Barnet F.C. players
English Football League players
National League (English football) players